Calder is an unincorporated community in Shoshone County, Idaho, United States. Calder has a post office with ZIP code 83808.

History
Calder's population was 75 in 1909, and was also 75 in 1960.

References

Unincorporated communities in Shoshone County, Idaho
Unincorporated communities in Idaho